An impression is the overall effect of something.

Impression or impressions may also refer to:

Biology
 Colic impression, a feature of the gall bladder
 Duodenal impression, medial to the renal impression
 Gastric impression, a feature of the liver
 Impression (dental), a dental procedure
 Maternal impression, the effect of maternal mental states on foetal development
 Renal impression, a feature of the gall bladder
 Suprarenal impression, a feature of the gall bladder

Psychology 

 First impression
 Mental impressions (from the Sanskrit "Samskara")
 Mental dispositions or conditioned phenomena (from the Buddhist term Saṅkhāra)

Idiomatic expressions 
An idiom is a phrase or a fixed expression that has a figurative, or sometimes literal, meaning.

 "To make a good first impression"
 "To be under the impression of"

Publishing and advertising
 Impression (publishing), a print run of a given edition of a work
 Impression (online media), a delivered basic advertising unit from an ad distribution point
 Cost per impression, cost accounting tool using in e-marketing
 Viewable Impression, a metric used to report on number of distributed ads that were viewable
 Impression (software), a desktop publishing application for RISC OS systems
 Impressions, the in-flight magazine for British Mediterranean Airways
 Impressions Media, an American privately-owned publisher of newspapers

Art
 Impression, Sunrise, an 1872 painting by Claude Monet
 Post-Impressionism, the development of French art since Manet
 Impressions, journal of The Japanese Art Society of America

Music
 The Impressions, a music group from Chicago
 Impressions (instrumental composition), a jazz standard composed by John Coltrane

Albums
 Impression (album), the soundtrack from the anime series Samurai Champloo
 Impressions (John Coltrane album), a 1963 album by jazz musician John Coltrane
 Impressions (Buck Hill album), a 1983 album by saxophonist Buck Hill
 Impressions (Chris Botti album), the 2012 album by trumpeter Chris Botti
 Impressions!, a 1959 album by Paul Horn
 Impressions (Laura Nyro album), the first compilation retrospective album by Laura Nyro
 Impressions (Lunatic Soul album), 2011
 Impressions (Mike Oldfield album), a 1980 compilation album by Mike Oldfield released
 Impressions (Mal Waldron album), a 1959 album by Mal Waldron
 The Impressions (album), a 1963 album

Other uses
 Impressions, a form of mimicry practised by an  impressionist (entertainment)
 Impressions (Angel novel), a 2003 novel derivative of the television series Angel
 Impressions Games, a video game developer

See also
 Impress (disambiguation)
 False Impression, a 2006 novel by Jeffrey Archer
 "First Impressions" (Angel), a 2000 episode of the television series Angel
 The Big Impression, a British comedy sketch show
 Impressions de France, a 1982 film about France
 Impressment, a type of forced military service
 Imprint (disambiguation)